Muhlenberg College is a private liberal arts college in Allentown, Pennsylvania. Founded in 1848, Muhlenberg College is affiliated with the Evangelical Lutheran Church in America and is named for Henry Muhlenberg, the German patriarch of Lutheranism in the United States.

History

Muhlenberg College was founded in 1848 in Allentown, Pennsylvania, as the Allentown Seminary by Samuel K. Brobst, a Reformed Lutheran minister. Christian Rudolph Kessler was the school's first teacher and administrator. Between 1848 and 1867, the college operated as the Allentown Seminary, the Allentown Collegiate and Military Institute, and the Allentown Collegiate Institute. In 1867, the college moved into Trout Hall, the former mansion of William Allen's son, James Allen, and was renamed after Henry Muhlenberg, the patriarch of the Lutheran church in America. Muhlenberg's great-grandson, Frederick Augustus Muhlenberg, served as president of the college from 1867 to 1876. In 1905, the college purchased and relocated to a  tract located in Allentown's West End, the site of today's campus.

In 1910, seeing a need for evening study in the community, the college began offering courses through a "Saturday School for Teachers". The offerings for adult education outside of the traditional baccalaureate track evolved over the years through various titles, including an "Extension" school. In 2002, Muhlenberg opened The W. Clarke Wescoe School of Professional Studies. With the addition of graduate degree programs, the Muhlenberg graduate program was renamed as the School for Graduate and Continuing Studies.

In 2019, Muhlenberg College named Kathleen E. Harring, a social psychologist, Muhlenberg's former provost, and a Muhlenberg faculty member since 1984, as its 13th president and its first female president. She succeeded John I. Williams, Jr., the college's first Black president, who served as president from 2015 to 2019.

Campus

Muhlenberg's current  campus is located in a residential neighborhood in Allentown's West End. The campus includes buildings with distinctive traditional European and Protestant red doors laid out on several college quads. The central part of the park-like campus is the college green, which incorporates public art, including Victor's Lament by sculptor Mark di Suvero.

The college's academic row runs the length of the main college quadrangle with Haas College Center, built between 1926 and 1929, in the center. Miller Tower, the dome and tower on top of the Haas College Center, was inspired by Tom Tower of Christ Church College at Oxford University. It is named for David A. Miller (class of 1894), founder of Allentown's The Morning Call newspaper. Muhlenberg's Polling Institute teams with The Morning Call to publish surveys of preferences and trends among Pennsylvanians, especially in the Lehigh Valley.

In 1988, the college opened the Harry C. Trexler Library, named for local industrialist Harry Clay Trexler; it was designed by architect Robert Geddes. The library houses over 310,000 volumes and 360,000 microforms on campus, and has access to over 1.75 million books via interlibrary loan. It also serves as a Federal Depository Library. Near the Trexler Library is the Philip Johnson-designed Baker Center for the Arts that houses the Martin Art Gallery. The Martin Art Gallery has a permanent collection of over 3,000 works of art and holds frequent exhibitions of pieces by student, regional, and international artists.

In 2007, a new science building and additional residence halls were completed. In 2010, Muhlenberg College expanded the Seegers Student Union, which included expanded dining facilities that are frequently rated as having some of the best campus food in the country.

Academics
Muhlenberg College offers bachelor's degrees with academic focuses on liberal-arts education and preprofessional studies. Around 85% of the faculty have a PhD or other terminal degree in their respective fields. The student to faculty ratio was 11:1 as of 2018. The college maintains chapters of over 15 national Greek Academic Honor Societies. Bachelor's degree programs for returning adult students are offered through the School of Continuing Education. Graduate degrees have also been offered since the 2020–21 school year.

The college offers accelerated programs, cross-registration between disciplines, double majors, honors programs, independent study, internships, Army ROTC, student-designed majors, over 160 study-abroad programs, teacher certification, visiting/exchange student programs, and a Washington, DC semester.

Admissions and rankings

About one-third (32%) of applicants were offered admission for the 2016–2017 academic year. About 44% of the students accepted for the 2013–2014 freshman class were in the top 10% of their high-school or preparatory-school graduating class, 69% in the top 20% of their graduating class, and 81% in the top 30%. Three-quarters of the freshman class receive some sort of financial aid. Muhlenberg is primarily a regional college, with 72% of incoming freshmen coming from Pennsylvania, New Jersey, or New York, but the school also receives a variety of applicants with admissions granted from the West Coast, including students from California, Oregon, and Arizona.

In its 2022 rankings, U.S. News & World Report placed the college at 76th among national liberal-arts colleges. Forbes ranked Muhlenberg 82nd on their list of the best liberal-arts colleges in the United States. Princeton Review lists Muhlenberg as one of the best colleges in the northeast out of a total number of 218 ranked colleges. As of 2016, the college's theatre program was ranked first in the nation by Princeton Review, its food 16th in the nation, and the college was chosen as one of the "Top 286 Green Colleges" in the country in rankings developed in collaboration with the U.S. Green Building Council. Muhlenberg College was also named as one of the Lehigh Valley's Top Workplaces in 2013.

Athletics

Muhlenberg College athletic teams are the Muhlenberg Mules and compete in NCAA Division III. The college has 22 intercollegiate sports, which belong to either the Centennial Conference or Eastern College Athletic Conference.

Both men's and women's teams exist for basketball, cross country, golf, lacrosse, soccer, tennis, and track and field. Men's teams exist for baseball, football, and wrestling; women have teams for softball, field hockey, and volleyball.

In 2004, additional athletic facilities were built west of the field house. Updated tennis courts were built in 2003 and two fields were added in 1997 and 1998. The baseball and softball teams do not have on-campus facilities. The football, field hockey, and track and field teams each perform at Scotty Wood Stadium, at 3400 West Chew Street, on the Muhlenberg College campus.

Football
Football was Muhlenberg's first official varsity sport, beginning in 1900. Doggie Julian was the head football coach at Muhlenberg from 1936 to 1944; his career record was 56–49–2. Julian was also the head basketball coach during this time and the head baseball coach from 1942 to 1944.

In 1946, Ben Schwartzwalder became head football coach. In his first season, he guided the Mules to a 9–1 record and a national championship with Muhlenberg defeating St. Bonaventure University in the Tobacco Bowl. The following year, in the 1947 season, Schwartzwalder again led the Mules to a 9–1 record; the season's only loss came by one point, in a 7–6 loss at Temple. The Mules declined an invitation that season to appear in the Tangerine Bowl. In 1949, Schwartzwalder departed to coach Syracuse.

After Schwartzwalder departed for Syracuse in 1949, the Mules fell off the national radar until the hiring of Mike Donnelly in 1997. Despite a rough 1–9 inaugural campaign, Donnelly turned the team around. From 2000 to 2004, the Mules won five straight Centennial Conference championships and earned five straight postseason berths. In 2007, the Mules again won the Centennial Conference and received another berth in the NCAA playoffs, winning their first-round game before falling in the second round. Donnelly's team won the Centennial Conference again in 2008 and earned a playoff berth, but fell in the first round. In 2010, they returned to the playoffs with the same result.

Since the 2000 season, Muhlenberg has compiled a 66–28 overall record in the Centennial Conference, second-best among all active and former members behind only Johns Hopkins University. The Muhlenberg football team has won the Centennial Conference championship seven times in the 2000s.

Nate Milne became Muhlenberg's head football coach in the 2018 season. He has a 35–5 record over his first three seasons. In 2019, he was named AFCA Coach of the Year Award for NCAA Division III.

Club teams
In addition to its 22 NCAA teams, Muhlenberg College has sports club teams in ultimate frisbee and women's rugby.

In popular culture
The 1998 HBO documentary Frat House addresses fraternity hazing and was largely filmed at the Alpha Tau Omega fraternity at Muhlenberg. Responding to criticisms from Alpha Tau Omega, HBO never aired the documentary, though it was later released online. Frat House was awarded "Grand Jury Prize: Documentary" at the 1998 Sundance Film Festival.

Student life

More than 100 clubs and organizations are on campus. In addition, the Muhlenberg Activity Council is responsible for bringing events and activities to campus. The college arranges off-campus community service opportunities and intramural and club sports for students. The performing arts are represented on-campus through various theatre, dance, and music programs.

The college's official student-run print publication is The Muhlenberg Weekly. Established in 1883, the paper is published every week while school is in session. The student-run radio station, WMUH, which broadcasts at 91.7FM, is operated year-round by both students and volunteers from the surrounding Lehigh Valley community. It is also available online by live stream.

Five sororities are affiliated with the college: Phi Mu, Phi Sigma Sigma, Delta Zeta, Alpha Chi Omega, and Theta Nu Xi; and five fraternities: Zeta Beta Tau, Alpha Tau Omega, Phi Kappa Tau, Delta Tau Delta, and Alpha Epsilon Pi. College regulations stipulate that students may not pledge to join a Greek organization until their sophomore year. Also, Kappa Kappa Psi, a band service fraternity, and Alpha Phi Omega, a service fraternity, can be pledged as a freshman.

Notable people

See also
List of historic places in Allentown, Pennsylvania

References

External links

Official website.
Official athletics website.

 
1848 establishments in Pennsylvania
Buildings and structures in Allentown, Pennsylvania
Eastern Pennsylvania Rugby Union
Muhlenberg College
Liberal arts colleges in Pennsylvania
Private universities and colleges in Pennsylvania
Universities and colleges in Allentown, Pennsylvania